The Battle of Ongjin was a part of the Operation Pokpoong that marked the beginning of the Korean War. The Republic of Korea Army (ROK) 17th Infantry Regiment fought against Korean People's Army (KPA) 14th Infantry Regiment and the 3rd Guards Brigade supported by a tank company at Ongjin.

Order of battle

Democratic People's Republic of Korea 
14th Infantry Regiment - Senior Colonel Han Il-rae
3rd Guard Brigade - Brigadier General Choe Hyun

Republic of Korea 
17th Infantry Regiment - Colonel Paik In-yup
 1st Infantry Battalion - Major Kim Hee-tae
 2nd Infantry Battalion - Major Song Ho-rim
 3rd Infantry Battalion - Major Oh Ik-kyung
 7th Artillery Battalion - Major Park Yeon-ho

Regional characteristics 
Ongjin Peninsula is located at the westernmost of the 38th Parallel. It is surrounded by the sea, and its only land route was through North Korean territory. There are strategic mountains at the center of the peninsula that can observe the entire peninsula easily. Prior to the Battle of Ongjin, the two opposing forces already had three clashes near these mountains in 1949.

The KPA had built supply bases nearby, and supplies could be transported by railroad. On the other hand, ROK forces received support from Port Bupho located at the southeast of the peninsula. Due to the wide range between tidelines, large vessels were only able to come up alongside the Port Bupho pier twice per day.

Prelude 
From 20 June 1950, ROK 17th Infantry Regiment began witnessing suspicious and unusual movements on the North Korean side of the 38th Parallel. The regiment spotted many high-ranking North Korean officers in North Korean bases and on the hills, but no North Korean civilians were seen. When the regiment received an order to call off its alert, regimental commander Paik In-yup ignored the order and kept his regiment on high alert for any possible attacks from North Korea. Eventually, Paik lowered the alert except on the front lines. However, when United Nations personnel visited the regiment they urged Paik to cancel the alert saying that it would cause the very issue it was in place to prevent. However, the day before the battle Paik ordered all troops to be stationed in their defense positions, giving the regiment a battle-ready stance for the upcoming attack.

Preparation

Democratic People's Republic of Korea 
Taking over Kangryong as fast as possible was the main goal for North Korean forces. The 3rd Guards Brigade prepared in the west, and the 14th Infantry Regiment with an armored battalion from the 203th Armored Regiment was tasked with capturing Kangryong.

Republic of Korea 
The 17th Infantry Regiment had to defend a 45 km line with limited troops. The 1st Infantry Battalion covered the west and the 3rd Infantry Battalion covered the east while the 2nd Infantry Battalion was stationed at the rear to act as relief. The regiment focused its strength at the Kangryong, protected by the 3rd Infantry Battalion, because it was most likely to be the primary object for North Korea. If Kangryong was taken, the regiment would lose its combat strength by half along with its path of retreat.

Battle 
At 04:00 on 25 June a red flare was shot in the air and KPA forces began shelling ROK defenses for 30 minutes. After the artillery attack, a battalion-sized KPA force thrust into the ROK 1st Battalion. Two companies of the battalion fought hand-to-hand, but were forced to retreat due to KPA reinforcement.

With the destruction of both wire and wireless communications, 1st Battalion commander Major Kim learned of the situation from retreating forces. He sent a reserve company forward, but this effort failed.  Major Kim was later killed by KPA artillery.

Meantime, the KPA 14th Regiment continued shelling on the ROK 3rd Battalion until 05:30. However, ROK forces was not allowed to return artillery fire until hours later because the U.S. advisors had full control over the battalion's 105mm artillery.

When KPA forces attacked the ROK defenses with tanks and armored vehicles, ROK forces employed M18 recoilless rifle in defense. These failed to destroy any tanks. The ROK 3rd Battalion then retreated and set up new defensive lines at Chimasan and Seokgyeri which left Kangryong and Yangwon vulnerable to KPA attack. Nevertheless, Colonel Paik ordered the 2nd Battalion to aid the 1st Battalion to maintain defense line on the left.

The 2nd Battalion ambushed and annihilated a KPA battalion then recovered the left of the line in a counterattack. The battalion then received orders to retreat, but refused and maintained the defensive line until the battalion learned the regiment had withdrawn to Kangryong. The battalion commander Major Song led both the 1st and 2nd Battalions to Buldangsan. When the troops arrived at Buldangsan, the KPA forces had already taken over Yangwon and Kangryong. Major Song abandoned plans to move to Port Bupho. Instead, he moved his forces to Sagot and retreated from there.

After retreating from Kangryong, the 3rd Battalion made its final defensive line and engineers blasted bridges to halt KPA tanks. However, the DPRK forces did not chase down the ROK troops. Later it was learned that the KPA 14th Regiment transferred the operation to the 3rd Guards Brigade after taking over Kangryong and moved to a different area to join larger battles.

LST-801 came to Port Bupho at 23:30 and most of the 3rd Battalion boarded. Heavy equipment and supplies except one M101 howitzer were either destroyed or thrown into the sea.

Colonel Paik ordered LST-801 to set sail. He remained with the 7th Artillery Battalion, where he worked with its commander, Major Park, and other officers till the last round was fired. They successfully fled the zone in a small wooden boat.

Aftermath 
About 90% of the South Korean forces and equipment in Ongjin Peninsula was evacuated to the mainland. The 17th Infantry Regiment moved to Daejeon and recovered all losses. The regiment returned to the front line at Osan and participated in later battles including the Battle of Inchon.

References

External links
"옹진지구 전투"

Ongjin 1950
Battles and operations of the Korean War in 1950  
Battles of the Korean War involving South Korea 
Battles of the Korean War involving North Korea
History of South Hwanghae Province
June 1950 events in Asia